Pirates of the Caribbean: The Legend of Jack Sparrow is an action-adventure video game developed by 7 Studios and published by Bethesda Softworks for the PlayStation 2 and Microsoft Windows. It features playable levels based on the experiences of Captain Jack Sparrow, voiced by Johnny Depp who portrays him in the movies, after the events of Pirates of the Caribbean: The Curse of the Black Pearl. The game includes action, puzzles and humorous cutscenes.

Gameplay
The player takes the role of Jack Sparrow (Johnny Depp), Will Turner (Crispin Freeman), and Elizabeth Swann (Eliza Jane Schneider) in typical action-adventure style gameplay. As players progress, each character learns new skills or unlocks new weapons which will be useful in defeating enemies and bosses. Each level has a number of puzzles to solve. The game allows for a second player to join in.

Plot
The game begins two days after the events of the first film with Jack Sparrow and Will Turner trying to steal an object from a Portuguese fortress in Panama. They are double-crossed and captured. While facing the gallows (and while Jack looks for an escape route as always), he begins to retell some of his stories to Will Turner, albeit exaggerated and not completely honestly; for instance, he always claims that either Will Turner or Elizabeth Swann was with him, even when they insist they have no idea what he is talking about. These stories include how Jack has escaped from Nassau Port without firing a shot; how he escaped from the desert island on the backs of sea turtles (when he was marooned with Elizabeth, the second time, he confesses to the true events, that he was rescued by rum smugglers that were long gone); how he fought a Chinese sorceress named Madame Tang; encountered a legion of frozen Norse warriors; visited the Arctic; The game is not only a sequel to the first film and a prequel to the other films but is also a retelling of Curse of the Black Pearl, complete with sequences that never happened and lines that were never said.

Reception 

GameRankings and Metacritic gave it a score of 53.58% and 51 out of 100, being "mixed or average reviews", for the PlayStation 2 version, and 48.80% and 49 out of 100, being "generally unfavorable reviews", for the PC version.

References

External links 
 
 

2006 video games
7 Studios games
Bethesda Softworks games
Cooperative video games
Disney video games
Multiplayer and single-player video games
Legend of Jack Sparrow, The
PlayStation 2 games
Ubisoft games
Video games developed in the United States
Video games scored by Inon Zur
Video games set in China
Video games set in Haiti
Video games set in Jamaica
Video games set in Panama
Video games set in the Arctic
Video games set in the Bahamas
Video games set in the Caribbean
Windows games